WBBK may refer to:

 WBBK-FM, a radio station (93.1 FM) licensed to serve Blakely, Georgia, United States
 WBBK (AM), a defunct radio station (1260 AM) formerly licensed to serve Blakely, Georgia